NAAI is a sportswear company headquartered in Belgrade, Serbia.

History
NAAI was founded in 1979 as a small textile firm in the Belgrade neighbourhood of Vračar, but quickly expanded to include the production of sportswear. By the late 1980s the company opened its first polygon for the manufacturing of sports shoes, quickly expanding into the production of Cycling paraphanelia. The company has offices in its native Serbia, Bosnia and Herzegovina, Croatia, Austria, Germany, France, Switzerland, Sweden and Denmark.

Sponsorships
The following teams wear uniforms and apparel manufactured by NAAI:

American Football

  Belgrade Blue Dragons

Basketball

  Dynamic

Football

  Sloboda Tuzla
  Zeta
  Jedinstvo
  Bečej 1918
  Borac Čačak
  Inđija
  Mačva Šabac
  Metalac G.M.
  Proleter Novi Sad
  Rad
  Radnički 1923
  Sinđelić Beograd
  Sloboda Užice
  Voždovac
  Žarkovo

Woman football clubs

  Breznica
  Rad

Handball

  Bosna Sarajevo
  Vojvodina

Tennis

National team

  Serbia

References

External links
  

Sportswear brands
Clothing companies of Serbia
Clothing brands of Serbia
Serbian brands